The 15th Central American and Caribbean Games were held in Santiago de los Caballeros in the Dominican Republic from June 24 to July 5, 1986, and included 2,963 athletes from 26 nations, competing in 25 sports.

Sports

Medal table

References

 Meta
 

 
Central American and Caribbean Games, 1986
Central American and Caribbean Games
Central American and Caribbean Games, 1986
1986 in North America
Cen
1986 in Central American sport
1986 in Caribbean sport
Multi-sport events in the Dominican Republic